State Road 39 (NM 39) is a state highway in the US state of New Mexico. NM 39's southern terminus is at U.S. Route 54 (US 54) in Logan, and the northern terminus is at US 56 and US 412 in Abbot.

Major intersections

See also

 List of state roads in New Mexico

References

External links

039
Transportation in Colfax County, New Mexico
Transportation in Harding County, New Mexico
Transportation in San Miguel County, New Mexico
Transportation in Quay County, New Mexico